Humbolt: The New Season  is a Canadian documentary television program about the aftermath of the 2018 bus crash that killed 16 members of Saskatchewan's Humboldt Broncos junior hockey team and injured 13 more. It was directed by Kevin Eastwood and Lucas Frison and commissioned by the Canadian Broadcasting Corporation for the CBC Docs POV television program.

Summary

The film focuses on the healing processes undergone by the survivors and their families. It follows the surviving players as they train for the 2018-2019 hockey season with new coaches and teammates and pursue recovery from injuries and trauma.

Production

The film was shot over the course of 11 months starting in August 2018. Co-director Lucas Frison was lifelong friends with Broncos' assistant coach Mark Cross, who perished in the crash, and Frison invited Eastwood to co-direct due to Eastwood's background in films about trauma and mental health. In a Canadian Press interview, Frison said making the film was part of his own healing process, and that his family connections to the area made it easier to develop relationships with the subjects of the film.

Release
The documentary aired on CBC Television on August 15, 2019 as part of the CBC Docs POV lineup, and was made available for streaming via the CBC Gem platform.

Reception
Pat Mullen of Point of View wrote "The doc is a poignant tribute to the players who make their community proud," while Victor Stiff of Thatshelf.com called the film "A powerful story of resilience and healing,". Greg David of TV-eh.com wrote: "The danger of making a project like this is that it can feel invasive, an excuse to get into the faces of those affected and exploit them. But the producers don’t ever do that. The result is a tear-filled story of remembrance and respect that everyone should watch."

Awards
 2020 Yorkton Film Festival Golden Sheaf Awards
 Winner: Ruth Shaw Award (Best of Saskatchewan)
 2020 Hollywood North Film Festival
Winner: Best Documentary
 2020 Canadian Screen Awards
Nominee: Best Documentary Program
 2019 Chilliwack Independent Film Festival
 Winner: Best Documentary

References

External links 
 

2019 documentary films
2019 films
2019 television films
Canadian documentary television films
Canadian ice hockey films
CBC Television original films
Documentary films about mental health
English-language Canadian films
Films shot in Saskatchewan
Canadian sports documentary films
2010s Canadian films